Silva Shahakian (born 1985) is an Iraqi–Armenian beauty pageant titleholder who was crowned Miss Iraq on April 10, 2006. She received the crown because the initial winner, Tamar Goregian, feared retribution from militants.

References

External links 
 ABC News
 ABC News
 MSNBC

1985 births
Living people
Iraqi female models
Iraqi beauty pageant winners
Iraqi people of Armenian descent